Litza Bixler (born August 25, 1970) is an American and British film choreographer, Artistic Director and Writer.  She is best known for her work with Edgar Wright on The World's End, Scott Pilgrim vs. the World and Shaun of the Dead. Other films with the Wright/Frost/Pegg stable include Nick Frost's salsa comedy Cuban Fury  and the romantic comedy Man Up (starring Simon Pegg).

Other film and TV projects include Peaky Blinders (TV Series), the musical show The Lodge for The Disney Channel, the romantic comedy I Give It a Year and the musical film Walking On Sunshine (previously titled Holiday!), featuring British singer Leona Lewis.

Early life
Litza was raised in southern Colorado.  Initially, she trained as a visual artist and studied Fine Art at the University of Colorado.  Having danced seriously since the age of 12, she gradually shifted her focus from illustrative art to performance. After completing an undergraduate degree in Performance Studies, she received her master's degree in Choreography, Ethnochoreology, and Dance Theory from the University of Surrey in 1995.

Career

Early work 
Litza created her first professional piece of choreography at the age of 16.  In 1996, she choreographed and performed Position Over Eyes, the first piece with her company Litzabixler Performance. She created three more pieces for the company; So Low, Moving Stills, and Pistola Junta before closing the company to focus on her film work.

Other Work 
Other work includes NVA's Speed of Light; a large site-specific piece featuring choreographed runners in light suits that opened the Edinburgh Festival in 2012, as well as choreography for numerous adverts and music videos. Litza worked with Ministry of Sound to create her own fitness DVD in 2006. She also writes and paints and is a certified Creativity Coach.

Upcoming Projects 
Litza has written an original musical screenplay and is currently working on a Gothic horror novel and a children's adventure screenplay.

Filmography

Films

Short Films and Television

Further reading

References

External links
Dust Baby Films

Litzabixler.com

Living people
British choreographers
American choreographers
British film directors
Writers from Denver
Alumni of the University of Surrey
University of Colorado alumni
1970 births